The Squash at the 2018 Commonwealth Games was held at the Oxenford Studios, Gold Coast, Australia. Singles play took place between 5 and 9 April.

Medallists

Seeds

Draws and results

Main draw
The draw.

Finals

Top half

Section 1

Section 2

Bottom half

Section 3

Section 4

References

Squash at the 2018 Commonwealth Games
Common